Paul Baras (May 14, 1870 – November 6, 1941) was a road racing cyclist and racing driver from France. He competed in several early Grand Prix motor races, and held the world land speed record between November 1904 and January 1905.

Born in Orchies, France, Baras originally competed in cycling events including placing third in the 1894 Grand Prix de Paris Sprint. He switched to racing cars, initially in hill-climbs.

Baras set the world land speed record on November 13, 1904.

In 1906, he participated in the inaugural French Grand Prix, and led the early stages of the race. He eventually finished seventh, although he also had the fastest lap of the race. The following year, he finished third in the French Grand Prix. In 1908 he retired after three laps of the race.

References

1870 births
1941 deaths
Cyclists from Hauts-de-France
French male cyclists
French racing drivers
Sportspeople from Nord (French department)